Seoni is a city in the Seoni district of Madhya Pradesh, India.

Seoni may also refer to:

 Seoni district, a district in Madhya Pradesh, India
 Seoni Assembly constituency
 Seoni (Lok Sabha constituency)
 Seoni, Himachal Pradesh, a town in the Shimla district of Himachal Pradesh, India
 Seoni Malwa, a city in the Hoshangabad district of Madhya Pradesh, India
 Seoni-Malwa Assembly constituency in Madhya Pradesh, India